St. Paul ( or) is a city in the Aleutians West Census Area, Alaska, United States. It is the main settlement of Saint Paul Island in the Pribilofs, a small island group in the Bering Sea. Saint Paul Island is well known as a birdwatching haven.  The population was 479 at the 2010 census, down from 532 in 2000.

Geography
St. Paul is located at  (57.133806, −170.266614).

Demographics

Saint Paul first appeared on the 1880 U.S. Census as an unincorporated Aleut village. Of its 298 residents, 284 were Aleut and 14 were white. In 1890, it reported with 244 residents. A plurality of 111 were creole (mixed Russian & Native), 108 were Native, 22 were white and 3 were Asian. It did not report in 1900, but from 1910–40, it reported as "Saint Paul Island." From 1950-onward, it has reported as Saint Paul. It formally incorporated in 1971.

As of the census of 2000, there were 532 people, 177 households, and 123 families residing in the city. The population density was 13.2 people per square mile (5.1/km2). There were 214 housing units at an average density of 5.3 per square mile (2.0/km2). The racial makeup of the city was 85.90% Native American, 12.97% white, 0.56% Pacific Islander, and 0.56% from two or more races.

There were 177 households, out of which 38.4% had children under the age of 18 living with them, 40.1% were married couples living together, 22.0% had a female householder with no husband present, and 30.5% were non-families. 24.9% of all households were made up of individuals, and 6.2% had someone living alone who was 65 years of age or older. The average household size was 2.88 and the average family size was 3.44.

In the city, the population was spread out, with 29.5% under the age of 18, 9.6% from 18 to 24, 32.5% from 25 to 44, 22.9% from 45 to 64, and 5.5% who were 65 years of age or older. The median age was 32 years. For every 100 females, there were 123.5 males. For every 100 females age 18 and over, there were 125.9 males.

The median income for a household in the city was $50,750, and the median income for a family was $51,750. Males had a median income of $32,583 versus $29,792 for females. The per capita income for the city was $18,408. About 6.4% of families and 11.9% of the population were below the poverty line, including 18.9% of those under age 18 and none of those age 65 or over.

History and culture
The Pribilofs, named after the Russian navigator, Gavriil Pribylov, were discovered in 1786 by Russian fur traders; no Alaska Natives are known to have lived on the island prior to this point. They landed first on St. George and named the larger island to the north St. Peter and St. Paul Island. In 1788, the Russian-American Company enserfed and relocated Aleuts from  Atka and Unalaska to the Pribilofs
 to hunt fur seals; their descendants live on the two islands today. In 1870, the now-American owned Alaska Commercial Company (formerly the Russian-American Company) was awarded a 20-year sealing lease by the U.S. Government, and provided housing, food and medical care to the Aleuts in exchange for seal harvesting. In 1890, a second 20-year lease was awarded to the North American Commercial Company, however, the fur seals had been severely over-harvested and only an estimated 200,000 fur seals remained. The 1910 Fur Seal Treaty ended private sealing on the islands and placed the community and fur seals under the U.S. Bureau of Fisheries. Food and clothing were scarce, social and racial segregation were practiced, and working conditions were poor.

During World War II, as the Imperial Japanese Army threatened the Aleutians; the 881 Aleuts on the Pribilof islands were forcibly removed, with no more than several hours' notice, to internment in abandoned salmon canneries and mines in Southeast Alaska until May 1944. The Aleut men were brought back to the islands temporarily in the summer of 1943 to conduct the fur seal harvest for the federal government, seal oil being used in the war effort. Most Aleuts from the Pribilofs were imprisoned at Funter Bay on Admiralty Island in Southeast Alaska. In 1979, the Aleut people from the Pribilof islands received $8.5 million in partial compensation for the unfair and unjust treatment they were subject to under federal administration between 1870 and 1946. In 1983, Congress passed the Fur Seal Act Amendments, which ended government control of the commercial seal harvest and most of the federal presence on the island. Responsibility for providing community services and management of the fur seals was left to local entities. USD$20 million was provided to help develop and diversify the Island economy—USD$12 million to St. Paul and USD$8 million to St. George. Commercial harvesting on St. Paul ceased in 1985. Ownership of fur seal pelts is now prohibited except for subsistence purposes.

Nature and wildlife

Birds
No fewer than 287 species of birds have been recorded on the island. In spring (May through mid-June) and fall (August through October), many rare birds, including Siberian vagrants, may be spotted on the island.  The cliffs of Saint Paul, Saint George and Otter Island support large numbers of breeding seabirds, including critical nesting habitat for the very range-restricted red-legged kittiwake.  The auk family is well represented here, with horned and tufted puffin, thick-billed and common murre, parakeet, crested and least auklets and ancient murrelet occurring as breeders, and several other species occurring as vagrants or seasonal visitors.  Breeding ducks include long-tailed duck, northern pintail, and green-winged teal.  Breeding shorebirds include semipalmated plover, the Pribilof subspecies of rock sandpiper, least sandpiper and red-necked phalarope.  Breeding landbirds are few, but include insular subspecies of gray-crowned rosy finch and Pacific wren, snow bunting, Lapland longspur, and the occasional hoary or common redpoll, or common raven.  Saint Paul Island Tours (part of the TDX Corp.) runs a natural history tourist program to the island of Saint Paul from May through early October, offering interested visitors the chance to explore the avifauna of the island.

Northern fur seals
One of the most notable sights on the island are the northern fur seal rookeries. The Pribilof Islands support about half of the global population, with some of the individual rookeries on Saint Paul Island containing over 100,000 seals.  In late May, the male seals begin to arrive and stake out their territories in preparation for the arrival of the females, who typically arrive during the third week of June. The females give birth soon after making landfall, and by mid-July there will be hundreds of young pups around the island.  On June 1, the rookeries are closed and remain off limits until mid-October. During the summer these marine mammals may be viewed, by permit, from blinds at two rookeries.

Harbor seals, sea lions, walrus, whales
Harbor seals breed on Otter Island, several miles southwest of St. Paul Island, but nonetheless are often seen off St. Paul shores. Occasionally, Steller sea lions haul out on St. Paul, but usually take refuge in the rookery at Walrus Island, some 10 miles northeast of St. Paul. On extremely rare occasions, grey whales, orcas, and walrus are observed offshore.

Blue fox
The Blue fox is a subspecies of the Arctic fox. Endemic to the island, the fox can be found roaming the hills and climbing the cliffs as it scavenges for food. Though clearly able to capture the occasional gull, foxes near the town prefer to scavenge garbage and explore the fishing docks and Processing Plant. Kits hide under storage containers and gobble a fisherman's offered scraps. Some kits shed their dark color much faster than their siblings and adopt a fluffy white/grey coat by mid-September. Foxes inhabiting areas farther from the human dwellings boast a more aggressive and territorial manner. Edging the fur seal rookeries, the two species cohabit easily.

Reindeer
A large herd of reindeer roam the island. Of domesticated Russian stock, 25 reindeer were introduced to the island in the fall of 1911, but, after a peak of 2,046 organisms in 1938, the number decreased to 8.

Wildflowers
In spring, with the greening of the island, wildflowers begin to decorate the maritime tundra landscape. There are more than 100 species of wildflowers, from the Arctic lupine, with its bluish-purple blossoms, to the glowing yellow Alaska poppy, that can be viewed.

Climate
The climate of St. Paul is Arctic maritime. The Bering Sea location results in cool weather year-round and a narrow range of mean temperatures varying from 19 to 51 degrees Fahrenheit. Average precipitation is 25 inches, with snowfall of 56 inches. Heavy fog is common during summer months. Lightning and thunder are virtually unheard of.  The last time a thunderstorm occurred in St. Paul was on November 8, 1982, which was the first thunderstorm in 40 years.

Facilities and utilities

Water is supplied by wells and an aquifer and is treated. There are two new wooden tanks; one 500,000 gallon and one 300,000 gallon. All 167 homes and facilities are connected to the piped water and sewer system and are fully plumbed. An ocean outfall line was recently added for seafood processing waste. The city collects refuse. The Tribe operates a recycling program which is currently on hold. A landfill, incinerator, sludge and oil disposal site have recently been completed. A new $3million power plant came online in 2000. A small wind turbine provides power and hot water to the village office, but it is not connected to the power grid. The village corporation has three turbines. Wind turbines were due to be installed summer/fall 2007. Electricity is provided by St. Paul Municipal Electric Utility.

Health care
Local hospitals or health clinics include St. Paul Health Clinic.  The clinic is a qualified Emergency Care Center. St. Paul is classified as an isolated town/Sub-Regional Center. It is found in EMS Region 2H in the Aleutian/Pribilof Region. Currently the City of St. Paul's Department of Public Safety provides no emergency medical services to residents or visitors on island. Two advanced life support ambulances sit idle at the community clinic due to a lack of staffing and funding provided for by the city.

Education
St. Paul is served by the Pribilof Island School District, headquartered in the city. St. Paul School is attended by 73 students and covers grades K–12.

Economy and transportation
The federally controlled fur seal industry dominated the economy of the Pribilofs until 1985. St. Paul is a port for the Central Bering Sea fishing fleet, and major harbor improvements have fueled economic growth. Trident Seafoods and Icicle Seafoods process cod, crab, halibut and other seafoods in St. Paul. 30 residents hold commercial fishing permits for halibut. Several offshore processors are serviced out of St. Paul. The community is seeking funds to develop a halibut processing facility. Fur seal rookeries and more than 210 species of nesting seabirds attract almost 700 tourists annually. There is also a reindeer herd on the island from a previous commercial venture. Residents subsist on halibut, fur seals (1,645 may be taken each year), reindeer, marine invertebrates, plants and berries.

St. Paul is accessible by sea and air. Most supplies and freight arrive by ship. There is a breakwater, 700' of dock space, and a barge off-loading area. A small boat harbor is under construction through 2005 by the Corps of Engineers.

The island has an airport, known as St. Paul Island Airport.  RAVN Alaska provides regularly scheduled flights to Anchorage using de Havilland DHC-8-100 turboprop aircraft.  There is one asphalt North-South oriented runway that is 6,500 feet in length.  Runway 36 has an ILS approach system, allowing for instrument approaches during times of fog and low ceilings.

Media
St. Paul is served by KUHB-FM 91.9, an NPR affiliate that broadcasts a wide variety of programming and music. St. Paul also has two low-power translators of the statewide Alaska Rural Communications Service on Channel 4 (K04HM)  and Channel 9 (K09RB-D).

Points of interest
 LORAN-C transmitter Saint Paul

See also

 Alaskan king crab fishing
 Deadliest Catch

References

External links
 North facing Weather Cam from the Alaska FAA website
 South facing Weather Cam from the Alaska FAA website
 West facing Weather Cam from the Alaska FAA website
 Central Bering Sea Fishermen's Association
 Pribilof School District
 Tanadgusix Corporation
 Alaska Community Database Community Information Summaries
 Community Photos from the Alaska Division of Community Advocacy Community Photo Library
 Timeline of Saint Paul History

Cities in Alaska
Cities in Aleutians West Census Area, Alaska
Historic American Landscapes Survey in Alaska
Populated coastal places in Alaska on the Pacific Ocean
Saint Paul Island (Alaska)